Mary Fox may refer to

 Mary Fox, Baroness Holland (1746–1778), English noblewomen
 Lady Mary Fox (1798–1864), English writer, an illegitimate daughter of King William IV of the United Kingdom
 Mary Fox (artist) (1922–2005), English artist
 Mary Frank Fox, American academic
 Marye Anne Fox (1947–2021), American chemist and educator

See also
 Marie Fox (1850–1878), also known as Mary, French writer and a princess of Liechtenstein
 Mary Fox-Strangways, Countess of Ilchester 1852–1935, English noblewoman